Sommières-du-Clain is a commune in the Vienne department in the Nouvelle-Aquitaine region in western France.

Toponymy 
It has been suggested that the name is derived from the Celtic words "Soli", suggested to be the name of a chieftain, and "maros" which means "big". However, there is ample evidence of the existence of a Celtic goddess named Solimara. Coins with her name and inscriptions dedicated to her have been found at Bourges. The maro/mara means "great", and Soli is from the Celtic "souli" meaning sun. It is far more likely that her worship was spread more widely throughout Gaul and that the name of the village is linked to an actual name/figure rather than one of conjecture.

See also
Communes of the Vienne department
The works of Maxime Real del Sarte

References

Communes of Vienne